Zanclognatha atrilineella is a litter moth of the family Erebidae. It was described by Augustus Radcliffe Grote in 1873. It is found in the southeastern United States.

External links

atrilineella
Moths described in 1873
Moths of North America
Taxa named by Augustus Radcliffe Grote